Riziero Ortolani (25 March 192623 January 2014) was an Italian composer, conductor, and orchestrator, predominantly of film scores. He scored over 200 films and television programs between 1955 and 2014, with a career spanning over fifty years.

Internationally, he is best known for his genre scores, notably his music for mondo, giallo, horror, and Spaghetti Western films. His most famous composition is "More," which he wrote for the infamous film Mondo Cane. It won the 1964 Grammy Award for Best Instrumental Theme and was nominated for the Academy Award for Best Original Song at the 36th Academy Awards. The song was later covered by Frank Sinatra, Kai Winding, Andy Williams, Roy Orbison, and others.

Ortolani received many other accolades, including four David di Donatello Awards, three Nastro d'Argento Awards, and a Golden Globe Award for Best Original Song. In 2013, he received a Lifetime Achievement from the World Soundtrack Academy.

Early life
Ortolani was born on 25 March 1926 in Pesaro, Italy. He was the youngest of six children. Ortolani's father, a postal worker, gave his son a violin at age 4. Ortolani later switched to flute after injuring his elbow in a car accident. He studied at the Conservatorio Statale di Musica "Gioachino Rossini" in his hometown of Pesaro before moving to Rome in 1948 and finding work with the RAI orchestra. Though the chronology is unclear, he also likely served as a musician in the Italian Air Force orchestra, formed a Jazz ensemble, and came to the United States as a Jazz musician in Hollywood, all before scoring his first film.

Ortolani married Katyna Ranieri in 1956.

Career
In the early 1950s, Ortolani was founder and member of a well-known Italian jazz band. One of his early film scores was for Paolo Cavara and Gualtiero Jacopetti's  1962 pseudo-documentary Mondo Cane, whose main title-song More earned him a Grammy and was also nominated for an Oscar as Best Song. The success of the soundtrack of Mondo Cane led Ortolani to score films in England and the United States such as The Yellow Rolls-Royce (1964), The Spy with a Cold Nose (1966), The Biggest Bundle of Them All (1968) and Buona Sera, Mrs. Campbell (1968). He also scored the 1972 film The Valachi Papers, directed by Terence Young and starring Charles Bronson.

Ortolani scored all or parts of over 200 films, including German westerns like Old Shatterhand  (1964) and a long series of Italian giallos, Spaghetti Westerns, Eurospy films, Exploitation films and mondo films. These include Il Sorpasso (1962), Castle of Blood (1964), Africa Addio (1966), Day of Anger (1967), Anzio (1968), The McKenzie Break (1970), The Hunting Party (1971), A Reason to Live, a Reason to Die (1972), Seven Blood-Stained Orchids (1972), The Fifth Musketeer (1979), From Hell to Victory (1979), the controversial Ruggero Deodato films Cannibal Holocaust (1980) and The House on the Edge of the Park (1980), and the first series of La piovra (1984). In later years he scored many films for Italian director Pupi Avati.

His music was used on soundtracks for Grand Theft Auto: London 1969 (1999), Kill Bill: Volume 1 (2003), Kill Bill: Volume 2 (2004), Drive (2011) and Django Unchained (2012). 

In 2013, he was awarded the Lifetime Achievement Award from the World Soundtrack Academy.

Death
Ortolani died on 23 January 2014 in Rome, aged 87.

Selected filmography

References

External links
 
 
 
 Riz Ortolani at Epdlp (Spanish)

1926 births
2014 deaths
People from Pesaro
Italian film score composers
Italian male film score composers
Grammy Award winners
David di Donatello winners
Nastro d'Argento winners
Golden Globe Award-winning musicians
20th-century Italian musicians
Italian jazz pianists
Italian male pianists
20th-century Italian male musicians
Male jazz musicians
Varèse Sarabande Records artists